Luanne Ruth Schedeen (born January 8, 1949), known professionally as Anne Schedeen, is an American actress who worked primarily in television. She appeared in numerous guest-starring television roles in the 1970s before portraying the lead role of Kate Tanner on the series ALF from 1986 until 1990.

Schedeen began her career in 1974, appearing in small television roles, and was cast in a supporting part in the sci-fi horror film Embryo (1976). She subsequently had recurring roles on Emergency! and Three's Company in the mid-to-late 1970s. In 1984, she was cast on the short-lived series Paper Dolls opposite Lloyd Bridges and Lauren Hutton. She appeared as Emily Phillips in the second season of the successful comedy series Cheers, before appearing in all four seasons of ALF. She later appeared in a recurring role on the series Judging Amy in 2001.

Early life
Luanne Ruth Schedeen was born January 8, 1949, in Portland, Oregon. Her mother, Betty Jane (née Moore) was also a native of Portland. Her father was Roland E. 'Poly' Schedeen, a farmer and former Oregon State Senator of Swedish descent. Her family name, prior to its Anglicization, was Sjodin. Schedeen has two younger siblings: a sister, Sarabeth, and brother Tony; as well as one elder half-brother, Brinkley (1946–2009), from her mother's first marriage.

Schedeen described herself as an introverted child: "I was so introverted as a little girl I would hide under the skirts of the dining room table and just listen to the adults." Due to her extreme shyness, Schedeen's mother enrolled her in youth drama classes to help her become "more comfortable with the world." Schedeen studied and performed with the Portland Civic Theatre. Schedeen grew up on a farm outside Gresham, Oregon, and attended Gresham High School, graduating in 1967. After high school, Schedeen studied at Portland State University, and later, Fort Wright College in Toppenish, Washington. Her first professional acting job was performing with a dinner theater on the Kauai island of Hawaii. She subsequently relocated to New York City to pursue an acting career.

Career

Early roles

In New York, Schedeen first worked in summer stock theatre and commercials before signing an acting contract with Universal Pictures, after which she moved to Los Angeles.  From 1974 to 1976, Schedeen appeared in a recurring role as Carol in the series Emergency!, and guest-starred as Doctor Marcus Welby's daughter, Sandy Porter, in 12 episodes of the medical drama Marcus Welby, M.D.. In 1976, she was cast in a supporting part in the sci-fi horror film Embryo, co-starring with Rock Hudson and Diane Ladd, in which she played the daughter-in-law of a doctor (Hudson) who uses growth hormones to begin growing humans.

In 1979, she had a supporting role in the television drama Champions: A Love Story, and subsequently guest-starred on several episodes of the comedy series Three's Company from 1977 to 1982. Schedeen had a supporting role on the short-lived series Paper Dolls (1984), co-starring with Lauren Hutton and Morgan Fairchild.

ALF and later work

Schedeen is best known for her role as Kate Tanner on the NBC sitcom ALF, which ran from 1986 to 1990, and in which she portrayed a mother who takes an alien into her home. ALF was a commercial success, and brought Schedeen international attention. After the series' conclusion, she appeared in Perry Mason: The Case of the Maligned Mobster (1991), followed by supporting roles in the television film Praying Mantis (1996) and the thriller Heaven's Prisoners (1996), starring Alec Baldwin and Kelly Lynch.

In 2001, Schedeen had a recurring guest-starring role on the legal drama series Judging Amy.

Personal life
Schedeen met her husband, a talent agent named Christopher Barrett, while the two appeared together in a stage play in 1972. The two married in 1982 on the tenth anniversary of their first date. The couple has a daughter, Taylor, born in 1989. 

In 2015, Schedeen became an ambassador for Holiday Heroes, a Bulgarian-based non-profit organization assisting disadvantaged families.

Filmography

Film

Television

References

External links

1949 births
Living people
American film actresses
American people of Swedish descent
American stage actresses
American television actresses
Actresses from Portland, Oregon
Gresham High School (Oregon) alumni
People from Gresham, Oregon
Portland State University alumni
21st-century American women